Cilvia Demo (also referred to as Cilvia) is the debut studio album by American rapper Isaiah Rashad. It was released on January 28, 2014, by Top Dawg Entertainment. The album features guest appearances from Jean Deaux and Michael Da Vinci, as well as his Top Dawg label-mates SZA, Schoolboy Q and Jay Rock. The albums production was handled by several record producers, namely Ross Vega, Mr. Carmack, Joseph L'Étranger, Black Metaphor, The Antydote, Farhot, Chris Calor, D. Sanders and a member of the Digi+Phonics Sounwave.

Cilvia Demo received universal acclaim from music critics. The album  also developed a cult following. It was included in several year-end top album lists by critics and publications. The album debuted at number 40 on the US Billboard 200, selling 8,500 copies its first week.

Music 
Cilvia Demo is a loose concept album that, according to Rashad, sums up his emotional struggle, from his teenage to adolescent years. The project is characterized by its personal themes, such as substance abuse, fatherhood, coming of age, and police brutality. Its music incorporates stylistic and production elements of southern, experimental, and progressive hip hop. The production consists of smooth, old school influenced, downbeat southern hip hop, with elements of experimental soul and trip hop. The project features hazy and atmospheric soundscapes of low, mid, to high-tempo beats with chopped and screwed background vocals; its abrasive main vocal set against smooth, slow burning southern-styled production.

Critical reception 

Cilvia Demo was met with universal acclaim from music critics upon its release. Praise was directed at the album's unconventional and experimental production, cohesiveness, and Rashad's unique style and thoughtful lyrics. At Metacritic, which assigns a normalized rating out of 100 to reviews from critics, the album received an average score of 82, which indicates "universal acclaim", based on 13 reviews. Rob Markman of MTV gave the project a positive review saying, "By the time the 14-track project winds down, Isaiah Rashad slowly doles out his own coming-of-age story using introspective raps, melodies and, at times, good old southern bounce." Marcus Dowling of HipHopDX said, "Every story and hook on Isaiah Rashad's Cilvia Demo connects on a human level. What it lacks in depth is covered by excellent production and raw talent." Michael Madden of Consequence of Sound gave the project a positive review saying, "At any rate, Rashad sounds like he belongs. He’s touched down on his own terms, and he’ll be sticking around for a while." Sheldon Pearce of XXL gave the project an overwhelmingly positive review, directing praise at the album's production, lyrical content, and replay value.

Accolades
Cilvia Demo appeared on multiple year end lists of the best hip-hop albums of that year. Genius hailed it as the seventh best hip hop release that year, while Rolling Stone placed it at number twenty-one on it year-end hip hop albums list. SPIN included the album on its list of the 40 best hip hop releases of 2014. Based on the buzz generated by Rashad's signing in 2013 and the EP, XXL revealed Rashad was included in their 2014 annual freshman class.

On June 29, 2016, Pitchfork Media published a list of "The 50 Best Rap Mixtapes of the Millennium". Cilvia Demo was included on the list, placed at the 35th position, despite officially being billed as an EP.

Commercial performance
The EP debuted at number 40 on the US Billboard 200, selling 8,500 copies its first week.

Track listing 
 All tracks written by Isaiah McClain, unless otherwise denoted.

Charts

References 

2014 debut EPs
Isaiah Rashad albums
Top Dawg Entertainment albums
Albums produced by Sounwave